Ceridia nigricans is a moth of the family Sphingidae. It is known from Madagascar.

References

Smerinthini
Moths described in 1959
Moths of Madagascar
Moths of Africa